Mrityunjay is an Indian television series based on the Marathi novel by Shivaji Sawant, produced by Jamshaid Ashraf and directed by Dr. Chandraprakash Dwivedi. It was telecast on Doordarshan in 1996. The series takes a look at the events in the Mahabharata

Though the series garnered many awards at the 3rd Screen Videocon Awards including Best Serial, Best Director (Dwivedi) and Best Art Direction (Muneesh Sappel), it was abruptly terminated for unknown reasons.

Cast
Karn - Rajendranath Zutshi
Karn (Young) - Abhishek Dwivedi
Adhirath - Rajendra Gupta
Bheeshm - Surendra Pal
Dhritrashtra - S. P. Dubey
Sanjay - Ishaan Trivedi
Dronachary - Ram Gopal Bajaj/ Jairoop Jeevan
Yudhisthir - Virendra Singh
Bhim - 
Bhim (Young) - Puru
Arjun - Narendra Jha
Arjun (Young) - Sunny
Duryodhan - Shrivallabh Vyas
Duryodhan (Young) - Raghav Soni
Shakuni - Prakash Dwivedi
Pandu - Suraj Chaddha
Shon (Karn's Younger Brother) - Bakul Thakkar 
Shon (Young) - Wajid Khan
Vidur - Virendra Saxena
Dushashan - Ravi Jhankal
Dushashan (Young) - Sharik Ashraf
Kripacharya - Chand Dhar
Ashwatthama - Ashok Lokhande
Ashwatthama (Young) - Prasad Barve
Ved Vyas - Ashok Mishra
Durvasa - Shiv Kumar Subramaniam
Madri - Ashwini Kalsekar
Ambalika - Asha Sharma
Gandhari - Meenal Karpe
Radha Mata - Meghna Roy
Kunti - Neena Gupta
Ambika - Poonam Jha
Sarathi (in Episode 2) - Ramshankar

References

DD National original programming
1996 Indian television series debuts
1996 Indian television series endings
Television series based on Mahabharata
Television shows based on Indian novels
Films directed by Chandraprakash Dwivedi